Calymmodon is a genus of ferns in the family Polypodiaceae, subfamily Grammitidoideae, according to the Pteridophyte Phylogeny Group classification of 2016 (PPG I). Its known range is Sri Lanka, Thailand, Vietnam, Taiwan, Malesia, Australia, Micronesia and Polynesia.

Species
, the Checklist of Ferns and Lycophytes of the World accepted the following species and hybrids:

Calymmodon acrosoroides Parris
Calymmodon acutangularis Parris
Calymmodon asiaticus Copel.
Calymmodon atrichus Copel.
Calymmodon binaiyensis Parris
Calymmodon borneensis Parris
Calymmodon clavifer (Hook.) T.Moore
Calymmodon concinnus Parris
Calymmodon conduplicatus (Brause) Copel.
Calymmodon congestus Copel.
Calymmodon coriaceus Parris
Calymmodon cucullatus (Nees & Blume) C.Presl
Calymmodon curtus Parris
Calymmodon debilis Parris
Calymmodon decipiens Parris
Calymmodon fragilis Copel.
Calymmodon gibbsiae Parris
Calymmodon glabrescens Copel.
Calymmodon gracilis (Fée) Copel.
Calymmodon holttumii Parris
Calymmodon hyalinus Copel.
Calymmodon hygroscopicus Copel.
Calymmodon ichthyorhachioides Alston
Calymmodon innominatus Parris
Calymmodon kaniensis (Brause) Copel.
Calymmodon kanikehensis Parris
Calymmodon kinabaluensis Parris
Calymmodon latealatus Copel.
Calymmodon ledermannii Parris
Calymmodon linearis Parris
Calymmodon longipilosus Parris
Calymmodon luerssenianus (Domin) Copel.
Calymmodon mnioides Copel.
Calymmodon morobensis Parris
Calymmodon murkelensis Parris
Calymmodon muscoides (Copel.) Copel.
Calymmodon ohaensis Parris
Calymmodon oligotrichus T.C.Hsu
Calymmodon pallidivirens Parris
Calymmodon papuanus Parris
Calymmodon pectinatus Parris
Calymmodon persimilis (C.Chr.) Tagawa
Calymmodon ponapensis Copel.
Calymmodon pseudoclavifer Parris
Calymmodon pseudordinatus Parris
Calymmodon ramifer Copel.
Calymmodon rapensis Copel.
Calymmodon reconditus Parris
Calymmodon redactus Parris
Calymmodon schultzei Parris
Calymmodon seramensis Parris
Calymmodon subalpinus Parris
Calymmodon subgracilis Parris
Calymmodon subtilis Parris
Calymmodon tehoruensis Parris

References

 Parris B. S. Grammitidaceae, Flora of Australia 48: 467 (1998).

Polypodiaceae
Ferns of Asia
Ferns of Oceania
Fern genera
Taxa named by Carl Borivoj Presl
Taxonomy articles created by Polbot